Linden High School is a public high school in Linden, California, United States. It is a part of the Linden Unified School District.

History
Linden High School began classes in 1921.

Athletics 
The following sports are offered at Linden:

 Baseball
 Basketball 
 Cross country 
 Football
 Golf 
 Soccer
 Softball
 Swim
 Track
 Volleyball
 Wrestling
 Tennis

Notable alumni
 Aaron Judge, MLB outfielder for the New York Yankees

References

External links
 

Schools in San Joaquin County, California
Public high schools in California
San Joaquin County, California
Educational institutions established in 1921
1921 establishments in California